Corona Regional Medical Center is a for-profit hospital in Corona, California that is owned and operated by Universal Health Services. The hospital is a 238-bed community hospital network comprising a 160-bed acute care hospital and a 78-bed rehabilitation campus. It is certified by The Joint Commission, employs more than 1,000 trained healthcare workers, and has a medical staff of approximately 300 physicians representing more than 40 specialties.

History
Beginning as the Corona Community Hospital in 1933, the hospital has changed and expanded to meet the needs of the rapidly growing communities of Corona, Norco and Eastvale.  In 1992, Corona Community Hospital merged with Circle City Medical Center, and the resulting entity became Corona Regional Medical Center.  In 2004, CRMC became one of the hospitals owned and operated by a subsidiary of Universal Health Services, Inc.

Services
Acute Care Services: Allergy Medicine, Bloodless Medicine, Breast Imaging Center (3D Digital Mammography), Cardiology & Cardiac Catheterization, Diagnostic Imaging (MRI, CT, Angio, Nuc Med), Emergency Services, Gastroenterology, Intensive Care Unit, Laboratory Services, Neurology, OB/GYN, Oncology, Orthopedic/Joint/Spine, Pediatrics, Inpatient Physical Therapy/Occupational Therapy/Speech Therapy, Pulmonary, Surgical Services, Urology, Vascular Services, The Wound Care Center ® (Hyperbaric Oxygen Therapy)
Rehabilitation Services: Behavioral Health- Inpatient & Outpatient, Skilled Nursing/Subacute Care, Home Health & Hospice, Palliative Care

Awards and Accolades
Home Care Elite Award 2011, 2012 & 2013
American College of Radiology: Accreditation in MRI, CT, Nuclear Neducubem Ultrasound and Mammography
CEP (California Emergency Physicians Group) Award - PA Site of the Year
College of American Pathologist (CAP) Accreditation
HealthGrades 5 Star Award in Gynecology and Maternity

Leadership
Sam Itani, Chief Executive Officer, the former top administrator of San Bernardino County
Bryan Vissar, Chief Operating Officer
Kyle Kim, Chief Financial Officer
Phyllis Snyder, Chief Nursing Officer 
Jeff Tupper, Administrative Director of Strategic Business Development

References

External links
Corona Regional Medical Center

Buildings and structures in Corona, California
Hospitals in Riverside County, California